A free radical is an atomic or molecular species with unpaired electrons on an otherwise open shell configuration. 

Free Radical may also refer to:

Chemistry 
 Free Radical Centre, a research center located in Australia that works in all areas of free radical chemistry
 Free-radical theory of aging

Arts and entertainment 
Film
Free Radicals (film), an American animated short by Len Lye
Free Radicals (2003 film), an Austrian film by Barbara Albert

Literature and publications
 Free Radical (magazine), a New Zealand-based magazine
 "Free Radicals" (short story), by Alice Munro
 Free Radicals: The Secret Anarchy of Science, a book by Michael Brooks

Music
Free Radicals (band), an American band
"Free Radicals", a song by American rock band The Flaming Lips on the album At War with the Mystics

Video games
Free Radical Design, a British video game developer